Croatian Dawn – Party of the People was a minor Croatian conservative political party established in July 2013. Party's founder and leader was Milan Kujundžić.

The founding assembly of the Party was held on 20 July 2013 in Zagreb. Milan Kujundžić was elected as first president, while Milan Petrak was elected for his deputy.

On February 5, 2014, Croatia dawn joined Alliance for Croatia, which was dissolved in 2015 due to poor election results.

In August 2016, Milan Kujundžić returned to the HDZ, and most party members followed. The party was removed from the Registry of Political Parties in the same year.

Electoral history

Legislative

European Parliament

President of Croatia

References

External links
 

2013 establishments in Croatia
2016 disestablishments in Croatia
Conservative parties in Croatia
Croatian nationalist parties
Defunct conservative parties
Defunct nationalist parties in Croatia
Organizations based in Zagreb
Political parties disestablished in 2016
Political parties established in 2013
Right-wing populism in Croatia
Right-wing populist parties